Rasa Polikevičiūtė (born September 25, 1970 in Panevėžys) is a Lithuanian cycle racer. One of her Lithuanian cycling contemporaries is her identical twin, Jolanta Polikevičiūtė.

She began cycling at age 13 under the influence of her childhood athletic coach and made her professional debut in 1990. Her top results in the years to come would include an overall victory at the 1997 Women's Challenge and a victory in the 2001 World Road Race Championships.

Besides her native Lithuanian, Rasa also speaks Russian, Italian, and French.

Palmarès

1993
GP de la Mutualite Haute Garonne - 3rd place
Tour de l'Aude Cycliste Féminin - stage victory
Berlin Rundfahrt - 1st place, 2 stage victories
Druzhba - 1st place, stage victory
Velka Cena Presova - 2nd place, stage victory
1994
World Team Time Trial Championships - 2nd place
GP Kanton Zurich - 1st place, 1 stage victory
Masters Feminin - 2nd place, 1 stage victory
Tour Cycliste Feminin - 2nd place, 2 stage victories
Tour de l'Aude Cycliste Féminin - 2nd place
1995
Lithuanian Road Race Championships - 1st place
Lithuanian Time Trial Championships - 1st place
Etoile Vosgienne - 3rd place, 1 stage victory
Tour de l'Aude Cycliste Féminin - 2nd place, 1 stage victory
Vuelta a Mallorca - stage victory
1996
World Road Race Championships - 2nd place
Masters Feminin - 1st place
Tour Cycliste Feminin - 2nd place
GP Presova - 2nd place
1997
Krasna Lipa - 2nd place, stage victory
Haute Garonne - stage victory
Tour du Finistere - 2nd place, 1 stage victory
Trophee d'Or - 3rd place, 1 stage victory
Liberty Classic - 2nd place
Women's Challenge - 1st place, stage victory
Tour de l'Aude Cycliste Féminin- 4th place
1998
World Road Race Championships - 4th place
Trophee International World Cup - 7th place
Women's Challenge - 5th place
Vuelta a Majorca - stage victory
Haute Garonne - 4th place
1999
Tour de Suisse Feminin - 5th place, stage victory
Thüringen-Rundfahrt - 3rd place, QOM jersey
2000
World Time Trial Championships - 3rd place
Tour de Suisse Feminin (2.9.1) - 2nd place, 1 stage victory, QOM jersey
Grande Boucle (2.9.1) - stage victory
2001
UCI Points List - 7th place
 World Road Race Championships - 1st place
World Time Trial Championships - 4th place
Giro della Toscana (2.9.1) - 3rd place
Grande Boucle Féminine (2.9.1) - 5th place
Thüringen-Rundfahrt (2.9.1) - 5th place
Women's Challenge (2.9.1) - 3rd place
2002
World Time Trial Championships - 8th place
Grande Boucle Féminine (2.9.1) - 1 stage victory
Giro d'Italia Femminile  - 5th place
2003
Giro del Trentino - 5th place, 1 stage victory
Giro d'Italia Femminile - 5th place, 1 stage victory
Grande Boucle - stage victory

References

1970 births
Living people
Sportspeople from Panevėžys
Lithuanian female cyclists
Identical twins
Cyclists at the 1996 Summer Olympics
Cyclists at the 2000 Summer Olympics
Cyclists at the 2004 Summer Olympics
UCI Road World Champions (women)
Olympic cyclists of Lithuania
Lithuanian twins
Lithuanian Sportsperson of the Year winners